Adulrach Namkul (born 2 November 1997) is a Thai badminton player. He settled for the bronze medal at the 2015 World Junior Championships in the boys' singles event. He also a part of the Thailand national team that won the bronze medal at the 2017 Sudirman Cup.

Achievements

BWF World Junior Championships 
Boys' singles

BWF International Challenge/Series (1 runner-up) 
Men's singles

  BWF International Challenge tournament
  BWF International Series tournament
  BWF Future Series tournament

References

External links 
 

1997 births
Living people
Adulrach Namkul
Adulrach Namkul
Competitors at the 2017 Southeast Asian Games
Adulrach Namkul
Southeast Asian Games medalists in badminton
Adulrach Namkul